Events from the year 1997 in the United Arab Emirates.

Incumbents
President: Zayed bin Sultan Al Nahyan 
Prime Minister: Maktoum bin Rashid Al Maktoum

Incidents

 Tajikistan Airlines Flight 3183 - flight crash.

 
Years of the 20th century in the United Arab Emirates
United Arab Emirates
United Arab Emirates
1990s in the United Arab Emirates